Andrew Butler (1796–1857) was a US senator.

Andrew Butler may also refer to:
 Andrew M. Butler, British academic
 Andy Butler (born 1983), English professional footballer
 Andrew Butler, American musician and member of the band Hercules and Love Affair
 Andrew Butler (MP), Member of Parliament for Suffolk
 Andrew Butler (rower) (born 1973), Australian rower